Lewis Gordon Hill (2 November 1860 – 27 August 1940) was an English first-class cricketer, who played one match for Yorkshire County Cricket Club against Derbyshire at the County Ground, Derby, in 1882.  Batting at number three, he scored 5 and 8, took a catch but did not bowl, as Yorkshire ran out winners by seven wickets.

Hill was born in Manningham, Bradford, Yorkshire, England, and died in August 1940 in Heaton, Bradford.

References

External links
Cricinfo Profile
Cricket Archive Statistics

1860 births
1940 deaths
Yorkshire cricketers
People from Manningham, Bradford
English cricketers
Cricketers from Yorkshire